Mukul Deora (born 12 July 1974) is an Indian film producer, musician and entrepreneur based in Mumbai, he is best known for his music album Stray and producing The White Tiger (2021). He is a serial entrepreneur and only Indian to make a global hit film, with over $200m value created till date in areas like packaging technology, digital content storage, workspace development, and film production and distribution. He is a multimedia artist who has performed at TED Talks India, Tate Modern, and Serpentine Gallery.

Film career 

In 2011, Deora produced Bheja Fry 2, starring Vinak Pathak and Kay Kay Menon, and has since distributed over 40 films via his company Watchtower Pictures.
 
Deora developed and produced The White Tiger, a film adaptation of the celebrated Man Booker prize-winning novel The White Tiger with Netflix.
The White Tiger is a 2021 drama film written and directed by Ramin Bahrani (Fahrenheit 451 and 99 Homes). The film stars Adarsh Gourav, award-winning actor Rajkummar Rao (Stree, Bareily Ki Barfi, Newton), and global icon Priyanka Chopra Jonas (Isn’t it Romantic, A Kid Like Jake, The Sky Is Pink) in pivotal roles. An adaptation of Aravind Adiga's 2008 novel of the same name, the story is about Balram, who comes from a poor Indian village and uses his wit and cunning to escape from poverty. The film was number one on Netflix in 64 countries and was seen by 27 million households in its first four weeks.

Music career
Mukul released his debut album Stray with SONY BMG in 2006. Stray was written, composed and produced by Mukul. Howie B, who has previously produced U2 and Björk came on as Executive Producer. Stray reached number 12 in the Indian charts, and was a critical success, with the UK's Guardian newspaper calling it "an uneasy, surreal new vision of India." 
Pennyblackmusic said "It's a hallucinatory experience; burgeoning with tension and personal angst, existential bafflement and the estrangement that can only truly occur when utterly surrounded by a metropolis of millions. Think of 'Naked Lunch' set in Bombay, remixed by William Gibson and starring a subcontinental Serge Gainsbourg with a penchant for better living through chemistry ... that's about as close as you're going to get. It's fascinating." 
Whisperin and hollerin's Huw Jones says - "Constantly expanding on themes and getting ever complex, Mukul’s kaleidoscope of audio delights showcase his heritage, Djing background and innovative thinking. Whilst never outright dark, there’s a potentially deviant side to his music that slowly hangs in the balance and becomes claustrophobic, but at no point does it become too oppressive, not just yet anyway, it’s a fine balance, but one that Mukul can strike with ease."

In 2011 and 2012, Mukul had a month-long radio show on Bob Dylan.

Entrepreneurship
In 2005, Mukul sold Mipak Polymers Limited, a packaging solutions company that he had started in 1999. Mipak had over 300 employees and 4 factories across India. 

Deora was the founder and CEO of Sonopress India, a division of Bertelsmann, Germany. In 1999, Deora founded Mipak Polymers, a packaging solutions company. By 2006, Mipak had over 300 employees in 4 manufacturing locations, and was acquired by Hitech Corporation.

In 2020, Mukul founded Lava Media, which is one of India’s leading content companies and recently produced the Oscar and BAFTA-nominated global hit film The White Tiger, starring Priyanka Chopra and Rajkummar Rao. Lava develops and produces high-profile intellectual properties in all formats – feature films, series, short-form content, and documentary.

Performances
In 2008, Mukul directed The Body Electric, with Shezaad Dawood. The Body Electric was used to launch the prestigious UK Cultural Olympics, and was projected on Norwich Castle for 2 days.

Dawood/Deora also performed at the Serpentine Gallery, London, as part of the Indian Highway show.

In 2009, Mukul had a solo art show titled BREAK in Mumbai. BREAK was a participative experiment. On entering the gallery, the audience was instructed to take a shuttle bus to an undisclosed location. They arrived at a derelict mill compound where they were asked to sign a disclaimer stating that they accepted full responsibility for any injury that might occur. They were then led to the scene which consisted of a car and sledgehammers. A situation was thus created, where the audience joined the experiment by smashing the car. It became an energetic, passionate, struggle, in which extremes of emotion were given free expression against that quintessential symbol of modernity, the automobile. By 2012, BREAK had achieved near-mythological status, and Diesel + Art had an exhibition with images and videos from the 2009 event.

Mukul performed at TED India, where he collaborated with Kalaripayattu dancers to create a piece called The Wandering Arrow- a juxtaposition of an ancient Indian martial form with modern abstract electronic music.

References

External links
facebook
Mukul online
Dupup

Living people
Indian male musicians
Digital artists
Cathedral and John Connon School alumni
1974 births